KRER may refer to:

 KRER-LP, a low-power radio station (102.5 FM) licensed to serve Emory, Texas, United States
 KEGE, a radio station (101.7 FM) licensed to serve Hamilton City, California, United States, which held the call sign KRER from 2005 to 2011